King Lake is a lake in Meeker County, in the U.S. state of Minnesota.

King Lake was named for William S. King, a cattleman.

See also
List of lakes in Minnesota

References

Lakes of Minnesota
Lakes of Meeker County, Minnesota